Giosue Ebong Bellagambi (born 8 November 2001) is a professional footballer who plays as a goalkeeper for the English club Huddersfield Town, but is on loan at Salford City. Born in England, he plays for the Uganda national team.

Club career
Bellagambi is a youth product of Lambeth Tigers FC and Whyteleafe, and moved to Huddersfield Town's youth academy in 2018. On 6 August 2020, he signed his first professional contract with Huddersfield Town. He began his senior career on loan with Ramsbottom United in November 2020, where he made 4 appearances. His second loan was with Ebbsfleet United, which ended in March 2021. He had a month-long loan with Stalybridge Celtic in August 2021 after recovering from a fractured finger. On 27 December 2021, he joined Brighouse Town on a 28-day loan. His sister is also Viola Bellaganbi

On 26 January 2022, he extended his Huddersfield Town contract until 2024. On 8 August 2022, he moved to Hyde United on a three-month loan. On 6 October 2022, his loan was cut short by Huddersfield. The following day, he signed on loan at National League North side Spennymoor Town on a loan until 2 January 2023.

SIBLINGS
Giosue Bellagambi  also has a sister called Viola bellagambi she is also in training to be a footballer just like her brother she sutton united since 2017 and still does

Salford City loan
On 31 January 2023, Bellagambi joined EFL League Two side Salford City on loan until the end of the 2022–23 season.

International career
Bellagambi attended youth training camps for England and Italy. He was first called up to the senior Uganda national team for a set of 2023 Africa Cup of Nations qualification matches in May 2022. He made his debut with Uganda in a 0–0 friendly tie with Libya on 21 September 2022.

Personal life
Bellagambi was born in England to an Italian father and Ugandan mother. His parents met while his father was travelling from Italy to watch Fiorentina vs Arsenal in the UEFA Champions League in October 1999. He attended Bishop Thomas Grant School in his secondary education where he further joined Arsenal on a scholarship.

References

External links
 
 

2001 births
Living people
Footballers from Croydon
Ugandan footballers
Uganda international footballers
English footballers
Ugandan people of Italian descent
English people of Ugandan descent
English people of Italian descent
Association football goalkeepers
Huddersfield Town A.F.C. players
Ramsbottom United F.C. players
Ebbsfleet United F.C. players
Stalybridge Celtic F.C. players
Hyde United F.C. players
Spennymoor Town F.C. players
Salford City F.C. players
National League (English football) players